Arnac-la-Poste is a commune in the Haute-Vienne department in the Nouvelle-Aquitaine region in western France.

Geography
The river Benaize forms part of the commune's northern border. The river Brame flows westward through the commune's southern part.

See also
Communes of the Haute-Vienne department

References

Communes of Haute-Vienne